The Irish Times Irish Theatre Awards recognise outstanding achievements in Irish theatre.

History 
The awards were founded in 1997 by The Irish Times. Awards were established in numerous categories, ranging from design, to acting, to overall production. The goal was to promote adventuresome theatre, both in the Republic and in Northern Ireland.

Description
In addition to the awards for specific excellence, the judges also present a special award for leadership in the overall community.

The nominations are announced every January and the awards are presented the following month in a prominent invitation-only ceremony. In 2022, the nominations for 2021 will be announced in May and the ceremony will take place early in the summer.

By year

2010 awards
(Winners in bold):

Best Actor
 Louis Lovett, as B and Brian in B For Baby at the Abbey Theatre
 Malcolm Adams, as Tim Hartigan in Slattery's Sago Saga
 Marty Rea, as Hamlet in Hamlet
 Karl Shiels, as Quinn in Penelope

Best Actress

 Olwen Fouéré, as the woman in Sodome, My Love
 Hilary O'Shaughnessy, as the tour guide in Berlin Love Tour
 Eileen Walsh, as Medea in Medea
 Aoife Duffin, as Winnie Butler in Christ Deliver Us!

Best Supporting Actor
 Laurence Kinlan, as Mossy Lannigan in Christ Deliver Us!
 Joe Hanley, as Fluther Good in The Plough and the Stars
 Ronan Leahy, as Tutor/Messenger in Medea
 Conor MacNeill, as Lyokha in Plasticine
 
Best Supporting Actress

 Andrea Irvine, as Lady Macduff in Macbeth
 Eleanor Methven, as Miss Prism in The Importance of Being Earnest
 Karen Ardiff, as Mrs Cregan and Sheelagh Mann in The Colleen Bawn
 Brid Brennan, as Madge in Philadelphia, Here I Come!

Best Director
 Selina Cartmell, for Medea, produced by Siren Productions
 Jo Mangan, for Slattery's Sago Saga, produced by Performance Corporation
 Wayne Jordan, for Christ Deliver Us!, produced by the Abbey Theatre
 Rachel O'Riordan, for Over the Bridge, produced by Green Shoot Productions

Best Set
 Aedin Cosgrvoe, for The Rehearsal, Playing the Dane
 John Comiskey, for Sodome My Love
 Tom Pye, for John Gabriel Borkman

Best Costumes
 Bláithin Sheerin, for Phaedra
 Joan Bergin, for John Gabriel Borkman
 Miriam Duffy, for The Birthday of the Infanta

Best Lighting
 Paul Keogan, for Plasticine
 Sinéad Wallace, for Happy Days
 Sinéad McKenna, for Medea

Best Sound
 Dennis Clohessy, for Sodome My Love
 Ellen Cranitch, for Phaedra
 Philip Stewart, for The Early Bird

Best Production
 Pan Pan Theatre, for The Rehearsal, Playing the Dane
 Siren Productions, for Medea
 Anu Productions, for World's End Lane
 Rough Magic Theatre Company, for Phaedra

Best New Play
 What's Left of the Flag, by Jimmy Murphy
 Slaterry's Sago Saga, by Arthur Riordan
 National Anthem, by Colin Bateman
 B for Baby, by Carmel Winters

Best Opera Production
 Opera Ireland, for Roméo et Juliette, by Charles Gounod
 Opera Theatre Company, for The Diary of Anne Frank, by Grigory Frid
 Wexford Festival Opera, for Virginia, by Saverio Mercadante
 Dumbworld/Brian Irvine Ensemble, for Postcards from Dumbworld, by Brian Irvine

Judges Special Award
 Project Brand New
 Theatre Upstairs
 Carysfort Press
 Louise Lowe/Anu Productions

2011 awards
(Winners in bold):

Best Actor

 Patrick O'Kane as John Proctor in The Crucible 
 Cillian Murphy as Thomas Magill in Misterman
 Paul Reid as Farrell Blinks in Man of Valour 
 Philip Judge as Older Man in Trade

Best Actress

 Charlie Murphy as Eliza in Pygmalion
 Amy Conroy as Gina Devine in Eternal rising of The Sun
 Marie Mullen as Woman in Testament
 Aisling O'Sullivan as Maggie Polpin in Big Maggie

Best Supporting Actor

 John Olohan as Byrne in Big Maggie
 Rory Nolan as Commissioner in The Government Inspector
 Frankie McCafferty as Ivan in The Seafarer 
 Bob Kelly as Martin O Bonnassa / Osborne O'Loonassa / Gentleman / Others in The Poor Mouth

Best Supporting Actress

 Dearbhla Molloy & Ingrid Craigie as Eileen and Kate in The Cripple of Inishmaan 
 Aoife Duffin as Abigail Williams in The Crucible
 Karen Ardiff as Aase / Green-Clad in Peer Gynt
 Caitriona Ní Mhurchú as Masha in 16 Possible Glimpses

Best Director

 Conall Morrison for The Crucible 
 Louise Lowe for Laundry
 Niall Henry for The Poor Mouth
 Gavin Quinn for All That Fall

Best Set

 Paul O'Mahony for Pygmalion
 Jamie Vartan for Misterman
 Sabine Dargent for The Crucible

Best Costumes

 Joan O’Clery for Peer Gynt
 Peter O'Brien for Pygmalion
 Gaby Rooney for The Lulu House

Best Lighting

 Adam Silverman for Misterman
 Aedin Cosgrove for All That Fall
 Ciaran Bagnall for Guidelines

Best Sound

 Jimmy Eadie for All That Fall
 Mel Mercier for Sétanta 
 Carl Kennedy and Tarab for Peer Gynt

Best Production

 The Lyric Theatre, Belfast for The Crucible
 Landmark Productions and Galway Arts Festival for Misterman
 ANU Productions for Laundry  
 Pan Pan Theatre for All That Fall

Best New Play

 Fight Night written by Gavin Kostick and directed by Bryan Burroughs for Rise Productions in association with Bewleys Cafe Theatre
 No Romance written by Nancy Harris and directed by Wayne Jordan for The Abbey Theatre 
 Trade written by Mark O’Halloran, directed by Tom Creed for Thisispopbaby
 Silent written by Pat Kinevane, directed by Jim Culleton for Fishamble

Best Opera Production

 Opera Theatre Company, for The Magic Flute, by Mozart
 NI Opera, for Tosca, by Giacomo Puccini
 Wexford Festival Opera, for La Cour de Celimene, by Ambroise Thomas
 Wexford Festival Opera , for Maria, by Roman Statkowski

Judges Special Award

 Val Sherlock 
 The Lyric Theatre 
 Fabulous Beast Dance Theatre 
 Landmark Productions

2012 awards 
(Winners in bold):

Best Actor

 Declan Conlon as Christy in The House
 Aaron McCusker as Algernon Moncrieff in The Importance of Being Earnest
 Marty Rea as Michael in A Whistle in the Dark
 Garrett Lombard as Tom in Conversations on a Homecoming

Best Actress

 Catherine Walker as Maeve Brennan in The Talk of the Town
 Eileen Walsh as Betty in A Whistle in the Dark
 Cathy Belton as Mary in The House Keeper
 Caitriona Ennis as Young Girl in The Boys of Foley Street

Best Supporting Actor

 Gavin Drea as Des in A Whistle in the Dark
 Aaron Monaghan as Liam in Conversations on a Homecoming
 Lorcan Cranitch as William Shawn in The Talk of the Town
 Owen Roe as Shelley Levene in Glengarry Glen Ross

Best Supporting Actress

 Jacqueline Boatswain as Mrs Muller in Doubt – A Parable
 Eleanor Methven as Mother in The House
 Marie Mullen as Missus in Conversations on a Homecoming
 Grace Kiely as Millie in The Mai

Best Director

 Annabelle Comyn for The House
 Louise Lowe for The Boys of Foley Street
 Andrew Flynn for Port Authority
 Oliver Mears for The Turn of the Screw

Best Set

 Jamie Vartan for A Village Romeo and Juliet 
 Joe Vanek for Orfeo
 Naomi Wilkinson for Alice in Funderland

Best Costumes

 Richard Kent for Titanic (Scenes from the British Wreck Commissioner’s Enquiry, 1912)
 Peter O’Brien for The Talk of the Town
 Lisa Zagone for Pagliacci

Best Lighting

 Nick McCall for The Great Goat Bubble
 Simon Corder for L’arlesiana
 Thomas Kluth for The Barber of Seville

Best Sound

 Carl Kennedy for Doubt - A Parable
 Little John Nee for Sparkplug
 Tom Speers for Macklin: Method and Madness

Best Production

 Druid Theatre Company for DruidMurphy 
 WillFredd Theatre and Absolut Fringe Festival for Farm
 AC Productions for Pinter X 4
 The Abbey Theatre and THISISPOPBABY for Alice in Funderland

Best New Play

 Quietly written by Owen McCafferty
 The House Keeper written by Morna Regan 
 The Life and Sort of Death of Eric Argyle written by Ross Dungan
 Halcyon Days written by Deirdre Kinahan

Best Opera Production

 Pagliacci composed by Ruggero Leoncavallo for Everyman Palace Theatre and Cork Operatic Society
 The Turn of the Screw composed by Benjamin Britten for Northern Ireland Opera
 FLÅTPÄCK composed by Tom Lane for Ulysses Opera Theatre
 A Village Romeo and Juliet composed by Frederick Delius for Wexford Festival Opera

Judges Special Award

 Karl Shiels
 Blue Teapot Theatre Company
 Stephen Rea
 Tom Creed and the city of Cork

2013 awards 
(Winners in bold):

Best Actor

 Lewis J Stadlen for The Price 
 Cillian Murphy for Ballyturk
 Rhys Dunlop for Punk Rock 
 Ciaran Hinds for Our Few and Evil Days

Best Actress

 Judith Roddy for Pentecost 
 Marie Mullen for Bailegangaire
 Aoife Duffin for A Girl is a Half-Formed Thing
 Sinead Cusack for Our Few and Evil Days

Best Supporting Actor

 Simon O’Gorman for Sive 
 Des Keogh for Dreamland 
 Mark Lambert for Twelfth Night 
 Ian Toner for Punk Rock

Best Supporting Actress

 Kate Gilmore for Breathless 
 Bríd Ní Neachtain for Sive 
 Aisling O’Sullivan for Bailegangaire 
 Caitriona Ennis for Spinning

Best Director

 Conall Morrison for Sive & She Stoops to Conquer
 Enda Walsh for Ballyturk 
 Selina Cartmell for Punk Rock
 Jimmy Fay for Pentecost

Best Set Design

 Paul Wills for Our Few and Evil Days 
 Jamie Vartan for Ballyturk
 Alyson Cummins for Pentecost 
 Mario Beck for Waiting in Line

Best Sound Design

 Carl Kennedy for Mr Foley the Radio Operator 
 Teho Teardo/ Helen Atkinson for Ballyturk
 Fergus O’Hare for Punk Rock and Pentecost 
 Tom Lane & Rob Moloney for Between Trees and Water

Best Costume Design

 Peter O’Brien for An Ideal Husband 
 Catherine Fay for Breaking Dad and Our Few and Evil Days 
 Mike Britton for How Many Miles to Babylon
 Niamh Lunny for Heartbreak House

Best Lighting Design

 Chahine Yayrovan for The Vortex and Punk Rock 
 John Comiskey for Sive 
 Adam Silverman for Ballyturk 
 Ciaran Bagnall for Pentecost

Best Production

 Landmark Productions for Ballyturk 
 Lyric Theatre for Punk Rock 
 Wildebeest Theatre Company for On the Wire 
 Abbey Theatre for Our Few and Evil Days

Best New Play

 Dreamland by Jim Nolan 
 Conservatory by Michael West 
 The Mariner by Hugo Hamilton
 Our Few and Evil Days by Mark O’Rowe
 Petals by Gillian Greer

Best Opera

 Der Vampyr by Heinrich Marschner, directed by Michael Barker-Caven and John O’Brien for Everyman and Cork Operatic Society 
 The Rape of Lucretia by Benjamin Britten, directed by Michael Barker-Caven for Irish Youth Opera and Wexford Festival Opera 
 Silent Night by Kevin Puts, directed by Tomer Zvulun for Wexford Festival Opera 
 Macbeth by William Shakespeare, directed by Oliver Mears for Northern Ireland Opera  

Judges Special Award

 Limerick City of Culture: Former programmers and the current administration for using the city in the most imaginative way to rebrand Limerick as a beacon of artistic endeavour 
 Lyric Theatre: For a consistently high standard of productions in a most welcoming venue 
 The Lir: For producing skilled graduates of a very high calibre 
 Stage managers and technicians: For keeping the show on the road after opening night and for loyal support to cast and creatives

2014 awards 
Best Actor

 Denis Conway for his role as Irish Man in the Gate Theatre production of Tom Murphy’s The Gigli Concert
 Adrian Dunbar for his role as Tommy in the Dublin Theatre Festival and Lyric Theatre production of Conor McPherson’s The Night Alive 
 Mark O'Halloran for his role as Donal Davoren in the Abbey Theatre/ Lyric Theatre production of Sean O’Casey’s The Shadow of a Gunman
 Marty Rea for his role as King Richard 11 in DruidShakespeare

Best Actress

 Cathy Belton for her role as Sal  in the Galway International Arts Festival production of The Matchbox by Frank McGuinness 
 Derbhle Crotty for her role as King Henry 1V in DruidShakespeare
 Susan Lynch for her role as Hester Swane in the Abbey Theatre production of By the Bog of Cats by Marina Carr 
 Aisling O'Sullivan for her roles as Hal/King Henry V in DruidShakespeare

Best Supporting Actor

 Peter Campion for his role as Katurian in the Decadent, in association with the Lyric Theatre, production of Martin McDonagh’s The Pillowman
 Brian Gleeson for his role as Sean in the Landmark Productions in association with MCD, production of Enda Walsh’s The Walworth Farce 
 Laurence Kinlan for his role as Doc in the Dublin Theaatre Festival and Lyric Theatre production of The Night Alive by Conor McPherson 
 Rory Nolan for his role as Falstaff in DruidShakespeare

Best Supporting Actress

 Clare Barrett for her role as Aoife/Margaret Gaj in the Rough Magic production of The Train by Arthur Riordan and Bill Whelan                
 Dawn Bradfield for her role as Mona in the Gate Theatre production of  The Gigli Concert              
 Amy McAllister for her role as Minnie Powell  in the Abbey Theatre and the Lyric Theatre production of Sean O’Casey’s The Shadow of a Gunman                
 Abigail McGibbon for her role as Sandra in the Rough Magic production of Everything  Between Us by David Ireland.

Best Director

 Grace Dyas for the THEATREclub production of The Game
 Garry Hynes for DruidShakespeare           
 Wayne Jordan for the Abbey Theatre and Lyric Theatre production of Sean O’Casey’s The Shadow of a Gunman and for the Abbey Theatre production of a new version of Oedipus by Sophocles          
 Pat Kiernan for the Corcadorca and Eat My Noise production of Gentrification by Enda Walsh     

Best Set Design

 Sarah Bacon for the Abbey Theatre production of The Shadow of a Gunman 
 Aedín Cosgrove for the Abbey Theatre production of A Midsummer Night's Dream
 Francis O'Connor for DruidShakespeaqre                                    
 Ciaran O'Melia for the Gate Theatre production of Shakespeare’s Romeo and Juliet

Best Sound Design

 Denis Clohessy for the Brokentalkers and junk ensemble production of  It Folds
 Gregory Clarke and Conor Linehan for DruidShakespeare
 Jimmy Eadie for the Dead Centre production of Chekov’s First Play 
 Tom Lane for the Abbey Theatre production of Oedipus by Sophocles in a new version by Wayne Jordan

Best Costume Design

 Sarah Bacon the Abbey Theatre production of The Shadow of a Gunman
 Catherine Fay for the Gate Theatre production of Romeo and Juliet
 Monica Frawley for the Abbey Theatre production of By the Bog of Cats 
 Doreen McKenna and Francis O'Connor for DruidShakespeare

Best Lighting Design

 Aedín Cosgrove for the Abbey Theatre production of A Midsummer Night's Dream   
 Sinéad Wallace for the Abbey Theatre production of Oedipus 
 Sarah Jane Shiels for the Brokentalkers and junk ensemble production of It Folds and ANU Production of  PALS – The Irish at Gallipoli         
 Adam Silverman for the Landmark Productions and Wide Open Opera production of The Last Hotel           

Best Production

 Chekhov's First Play: a Dead Centre production of Chekhov’s First Play by Anton Chekhov 
 The Gigli Concert:  a Gate Theatre Production
 PALS – The Irish at Gallipoli: ANU Production in association with the National Museum of Ireland and Department of Arts, Heritage and the Gaeltacht with the National Archives of Ireland and ICTU 
 DruidShakespeare: a co-production with Lincoln Center Festival NYC of Richard 11 ( Parts 1 & 2 ) and Henry V by William Shakespeare in a new adaptation by Mark O’Rowe,  

Best New Play

 Scorch by Stacey Gregg produced by Prime Cut Productions in association with The MAC and Outburst Arts            
 The Night Alive by Conor McPherson produced by Dublin Theatre Festival and Lyric Theatre, Belfast
 The Matchbox by Frank McGuinness produced by the Galway International Arts Festival 
 Luck Just Kissed You Hello by Amy Conroy produced by HotForTheatre  and Galway International Arts Festival   

Best Opera

 Agrippina: the Irish Youth  Opera’s production of Handel’s Agrippina, a co-production with Northern Ireland Opera in association with the Irish Chamber Orchestra and the Lime Tree Theatre Limerick
 Faust: The Everyman and Cork Operatic Society production of Gounod’s Faust
 Gugliemo Ratcliff: the Wexford Festival Opera production of Guglielmo Ratcliff in association with the Italian Institute of Culture  
 The Last Hotel: the Landmark Productions and Wide Open Opera production of The Last Hotel by Donnacha Dennehy and Enda Walsh  

Judges Special Award

 Druid Shakespeare for the way in which the company has assembled and enabled a group of actors to work together as a true ensemble, the pinnacle of this rare achievement being its 2015 Druid Shakespeare production                                           
 Blue Raincoat Theatre Company, Sligo, for its imaginative restoration of the theatre of W B Yeats as part of its A Country Under Wave programme                                       
 Lian Bell for leading the wakingthefeminists movement with courage and conviction, highlighting the inequalities in Irish theatre and advocating for sustainable change.                  
 Galway International Arts Festival for its consistently supportive role as co-producer to the independent theatre sector

References

External links
 Event page for Project Brand New, HERE Arts Center

Awards established in 1997
The Irish Times
Irish theatre awards
Awards by newspapers
1997 establishments in Ireland